Dammbach is a community in the Aschaffenburg district in the Regierungsbezirk of Lower Franconia (Unterfranken) in Bavaria, Germany, and a member of the  Verwaltungsgemeinschaft (municipal association) of Mespelbrunn, whose seat is in Heimbuchenthal.

Geography

Location
The community lies in the centre of the Spessart (range), in the so-called High Spessart (Hochspessart). The namesake brook, the Dammbach, rises near Rohrbrunn and has many small tributaries.

As for elevation extremes, the community's lowest point lies in the constituent community of Neuhammer at 200 m above sea level, and the highest on the Geishöhe at 525 m.

Subdivision
The community of Dammbach contains several small hamlets such as Schnorrhof, Hundsrück, Heppe and Oberwintersbach.

History
In 1991, the community celebrated the festival “750 years of villages in the Dammbach valley”.

Amalgamations
The community came into being in 1976 in the course of municipal restructuring in Bavaria out of the formerly self-administering communities of Wintersbach and Krausenbach. Since both constituent communities were in the Dammbach valley (Dammbachtal in German), Dammbach was chosen as the new name.

Economy

In the last few years, the community of Dammbach has opened up a weekend neighbourhood near the constituent community of Wintersbach in which more than 100 weekend and holiday homes have been built.

Since 1 December 2006, the community of Dammbach has been levying a tax on second homes.

Governance

Community council

The council is made up of 14 council members, not counting the mayor.

(as at municipal election held on 3 March 2008)

Coat of arms
The community's arms might be described thus: In chief above a bar wavy argent enhanced, gules an acorn in pale surmounted by two oakleaves in saltire of the first, the base party per pale, dexter barry of eight gules and Or, sinister azure a bend sinister argent surmounted by three rings azure.

Dammbach is a very new community, having arisen only in 1976 out of the formerly self-administering communities of Wintersbach and Krausenbach through voluntary merger. Geographically it lies on the Dammbach, whence its name comes. This brook has as a reference to it the wavy bar in the community's arms. The oakleaves and acorn in the chief symbolize the community's location in the High Spessart. Below the wavy bar on the dexter (armsbearer's right, viewer's left) side, the red and gold bars are taken from the arms formerly borne by the Counts of Rieneck. Krausenbach was for a long time one of their holdings. The bend sinister on the sinister (armsbearer's left, viewer's right) side with the rings is taken from the arms formerly borne by the family Echter von Mespelbrunn. They held the lordship over Wintersbach, building a church there in 1415 and a hospital in 1584.

The arms were conferred on 22 July 1988.

Infrastructure

Transport
In Dammbach is found the air navigation beacon “PSA” of an international airway.

References

Aschaffenburg (district)
Populated places established in 1976